Thomas Pfeilstöcker (born 18 July 1978) is an Austrian footballer.

Career
Pfeilstöcker was born in Bruck an der Mur and played with SV Oberaich, Kapfenberger SV, DSV Leoben, SVA Kindberg, SV Grödig, FC Bischofswiesen and FC Munderfing. He retired from playing professional football in 2011 to become groundsman at SV Grödig whilst also playing for the club's amateur team. In December 2013 due to a defensive crisis caused by the sackings of Dominique Taboga and Thomas Zündel for a betting scandal, Pfeilstöcker was included on the bench against SV Ried on 7 December 2013. He came on in the final few moments as Grödig won the match 3–0 which led to the local newspaper to proclaim that Grödig can win even with their groundsman.

References

External links
 

Austrian footballers
Austrian Football Bundesliga players
1978 births
Living people
Kapfenberger SV players
DSV Leoben players
SV Grödig players
People from Bruck an der Mur
Association football defenders
Footballers from Styria